is a Japanese footballer who plays for Fagiano Okayama.

National team career
In October 2009, Hiroki was elected Japan U-17 national team for 2009 U-17 World Cup. He played 2 matches.

Club statistics
Updated to 23 February 2018.

References

External links

Profile at Renofa Yamaguchi FC

1992 births
Living people
Tokyo Gakugei University alumni
Association football people from Tokyo Metropolis
People from Akishima, Tokyo
Japanese footballers
Japan youth international footballers
J2 League players
J3 League players
Renofa Yamaguchi FC players
Fagiano Okayama players
Association football defenders